Aktepe (literally "white hill") is a Turkic name that may refer to:

 Aktepe, Besni, a village in the district of Besni, Adıyaman Province, Turkey
 Aktepe, Çınar
 Aktepe, Hassa, a town in the district of Hassa, Hatay Province, Turkey
 Aktepe, Haymana, a village in the district of Haymana, Ankara Province, Turkey
 Aktepe, Kalecik, a village in the district of Kalecik, Ankara Province, Turkey
 Aktepe, Mengen, a village in the district of Mengen, Bolu Province, Turkey
 Ankara Aktepe Stadium, a multi-use stadium in Ankara Province, Turkey

See also 
 Aktobe
 Aq Tappeh (disambiguation)